Neulainen Jerkunen (1994) is the debut album of the Finnish rock group Absoluuttinen Nollapiste.

Track listing
 "Takalaittomien määrä ja taajuus" (Tommi Liimatta) – 0:10
 "Lue tarina, osta puku, opi tanssi" (Liimatta) – 4:45
 "Matkustajakoti Lintukoto" (Liimatta) – 3:19
 "Kivoja kansioita" (Liimatta) – 4:33
 "Ääniaallot tappaa syövän" (Liimatta) – 1:09
 "Neulainen Jerkunen" (Liimatta) – 7:00
 "Laatikkohevonen" (Liimatta) – 2:29
 "Paikallinen nimikauhu tulee ellei maissi lopu" (Liimatta) – 4:51
 "Ehdokkaat" (Aake Otsala, Liimatta) – 2:52
 "Hallitsevien piirien vaatimukset" (Liimatta) – 3:46
 "Siibu diibu daps dimli damlix" (Otsala, Liimatta, Aki Lääkkölä, Tomi Krutsin) – 1:29
 "Syöt sen minkä jaksat" (Liimatta) – 7:19
 "Pimeässä vietetty aika minuuteissa" (Liimatta) – 5:40
 "Polki polveen katsos kiloheederle kaufen" (Liimatta) – 0:10
 "Rarmos ybrehtar" (Liimatta) – 2:35
 "Valtani viimeinen päivä" (Liimatta) – 10:17
 "Seuraudet, Baude" (Liimatta) – 1:08

Personnel
 Tommi Liimatta - Vocals, Wind Instruments, Chiquita Guitar
 Aki Lääkkölä - Guitars, Mandolin, Keyboards
 Aake Otsala - Bass Guitar
 Tomi Krutsin - Drums, Vocals

External links
  Album entry at band's official website

Absoluuttinen Nollapiste albums
1994 debut albums